William Lee Lyons Brown Jr. (born August 2, 1936) is an American former diplomat who served as the U.S. Ambassador to Austria. He was also the CEO and Honorary Trustee of The Metropolitan Museum of Art.

Brown was born in Louisville, Kentucky. A graduate of the University of Virginia and the American Graduate School of International Management (now called Thunderbird School of Global Management), he was the president, chairman, CEO, and a director of the Brown-Forman Corporation, founded by his great-grandfather. He served on the President's Advisory Committee for Trade Policy and Negotiations, as an appointee under three Presidents - Reagan (1988), Bush (1990 and 1992) and Clinton (1994).

References

External links
KEEPING IT ALL IN THE FAMILY For 119 years, Browns have run distiller Brown-Forman. Their secret? Meritocratic nepotism, dogged consistency, and premium brands like Jack Daniel's.

1936 births
Living people
Ambassadors of the United States to Austria
American chief executives
University of Virginia alumni
People associated with the Metropolitan Museum of Art
Thunderbird School of Global Management alumni
People from Louisville, Kentucky